Look at These Eyes is the first EP from Austrian melodic metalcore band Sympathy for Nothing. It was released in 2008 and was sold at the semi-finals of Austrian Band Contest. It consists of six tracks.

Track listing 
 Way
 Promise
 Consequence
 Look at these eyes
 Brainkiller
 Powerless Boy

External links 
 Album at spirit-of-metal

Sympathy for Nothing albums
2008 EPs